Judy Kimball Simon (born June 17, 1938) is an American professional golfer, best known for winning the LPGA Championship in 1962, a women's major championship.

Amateur career
Born in Sioux City, Iowa, Kimball graduated from the University of Kansas in 1960. She was Iowa State Amateur champion in 1958 and a semifinalist in the 1959 Trans-Miss and the 1960 Western Amateur. She was also the low amateur at the Waterloo Women's Open Invitational in 1958.

Professional career
Kimball turned professional in 1961 and won three LPGA tournaments, including the LPGA Championship in 1962. She was inducted into the Iowa Golf Hall of Fame in 1993 and the Iowa Sports Hall of Fame in 1997.

Amateur wins
1958 Iowa State Women's Amateur

Professional wins

LPGA Tour wins (3)

Other wins (2)
1966 Yankee Women's Open (with Gloria Ehret)
1971 LPGA Four-Ball Championship (with Kathy Whitworth)

Major championships

Wins (1)

See also
Chronological list of LPGA major golf champions
List of golfers with most LPGA major championship wins

References

External links

American female golfers
LPGA Tour golfers
Winners of LPGA major golf championships
Golfers from Iowa
University of Kansas alumni
Sportspeople from Sioux City, Iowa
1938 births
Living people
21st-century American women